The 1930 WAFL season was the 46th season of the West Australian Football League in its various incarnations, and the last before it changed its name to the ‘Western Australian National Football League’. The season saw  win the premiership for the third consecutive season, marking the second time that the club had achieved the feat; the club was never seriously challenged as the best team except during the interstate break and achieved the unusual feat of being the only club with a percentage of over 100. Jerry Dolan said in retrospect that East Fremantle's 1930 team was the greatest he had ever played in or coached – including even the unbeaten team of 1946.

As with the VFL, the 1930 WAFL season saw a major innovation with the introduction of a ‘nineteenth man’ who could replace players either injured or out of form. This was changed to a nineteenth and twentieth man in 1946 and to the current interchange system in 1978. A controversial new holding the ball rule, which required the ball to be kicked or punched when tackled, was introduced for this season, but was regarded as unsatisfactory and replaced by the old rule, where a player could kick or drop the ball when tackled, in Victoria from 14 June and throughout Australia from 5 July, with the rule being officially re-amended two weeks later

For 1930 the WAFL reconstituted the seconds competition, which had been inaugurated five seasons beforehand, as the ‘Western Australian National Football Association’ (W.A.N.F.A) and required the teams in this competition to play league players when dropped through loss of form or return of top players.

Home-and-away season

Round 1 (Easter weekend)

Round 2

Round 3 (Labour Day)

Round 4

Round 5

Round 6

Round 7

Round 8 (Foundation Day)

Round 9

Round 10

Round 11

Round 12

Round 13

Round 14

Round 15

Round 16

Round 17

Round 18

Round 19

Round 20

Round 21

Ladder

Finals

First semi-final

Second semi-final

Grand Final

Notes
The unbeaten Port Adelaide team of 1914 is the only other club to equal this.Since this match, Perth has drawn only with West Perth (in 1944, 1960, 1986 and 2008) and Swan Districts (in 1961, 1971 and 2009)In wet weather before the advent of lights, it was not uncommon for matches to finish in complete darkness, as happened between Perth and East Perth in May 1956.Gary Ablett senior equalled Hopkins for Geelong against Essendon in the sixth round of 1993.

References

External links
Official WAFL website
West Australian Football League (WAFL), 1930

West Australian Football League seasons
WAFL